Penal Reform International (commonly known as PRI), founded in London in 1989, is an international nongovernmental organization working on penal and criminal justice reform worldwide.

Activities
PRI's stated goal is to promote safe and secure societies where offenders are held to account, victims’ rights are recognised, sentences are proportionate and the primary purpose of prison is social rehabilitation not retribution.

PRI has five offices worldwide. PRI’s Head Office in London (UK) leads and coordinates its cross-regional programmes, international policy and advocacy activities. Its regional offices in the Middle East and North Africa, Central and Eastern Europe, Central Asia and the South Caucasus implement practical programmes and provide technical assistance at a national and regional level. PRI also currently delivers programmes through partners in East Africa and South Asia.

PRI has consultative status at the United Nations (ECOSOC), the Inter-Parliamentary Union, the African Commission on Human and Peoples’ Rights, the African Committee of Experts on the Rights and Welfare of the Child and the Council of Europe.

PRI produces information resources for policy-makers and criminal justice agencies, including research reports, policy briefings and training materials. Publications include Making Law and Policy that Work and more recently, Global Prison Trends, an annual overview of current trends and challenges in policy and practice in the criminal justice and penal fields.

History
PRI was founded in 1989 by a group of criminal justice and human rights activists after the fall of the Berlin Wall. Founder members include Ahmed Othmani, a former Tunisian political prisoner and activist, and Baroness Vivien Stern.

Since its establishment, PRI has worked at the United Nations to improve norms and standards to strengthen the protection of the rights of people in criminal justice systems.

It helped to negotiate the 2010 United Nations Rules for the Treatment of Women Prisoners and Non-Custodial Measures for Women Offenders. Between 2011 and 2015, it took part in the negotiations for the revision of the United Nations Standard Minimum Rules for the Treatment of Prisoners – renamed ‘the Mandela Rules’ – a key set of standards used in prison administration.

PRI became known in particular for its work in Africa in the 1990s and 2000s, for example, helping to establish the Paralegal Advisory Service (PAS) in Malawi, which became a model for the development of paralegal services in other African countries, and setting up a community service programme in Zimbabwe in 1992 in response to a serious crisis of overcrowding in its prisons. PRI went on to develop community service programmes in Kenya and Burkina Faso, and is working in East Africa today with national probation services develop community service.

PRI also worked with the Rwandan government to deal with the overwhelming number of genocide cases in the late 1990s and early 2000s. This included the development and monitoring of the Gacaca Court (‘grass court’) process.

References

External links
 Official website

Prison-related organizations
International charities
Charities based in London
Prison reform